Belgrave Harriers, founded in October 1887, is an athletics club in Britain, with headquarters located in Wimbledon, close to Wimbledon Common. As of February 2013, they had the most successful record in the history of the British Athletics League, with 11 titles.

In the early days, the clubs's administrative headquarters were at the Kings Arms public house in Belgravia, central London, and races were held along the Embankment of the River Thames and also over the common lands south of London, particularly on Wimbledon Common. These days, Belgrave's home track is located at the Millennium Arena, Battersea Park and club members, known as 'Belgravians', train there on Tuesday and Thursday evenings.

Belgrave Harriers compete in track and field, road running, racewalking and cross country events, and have traditionally drawn their members from South London and Surrey, but in recent decades have athletes from all over the United Kingdom and overseas.

Belgrave Harriers' most successful period lasted from the 1920s to the 1950s, but the 21st century saw a resurgence, and they have won 29 national championships in this period on the road, in cross-country and on the track. In 2013, however, they announced their withdrawal from the British Athletics League due to a shortage of necessary volunteer officials.

The club's membership contains several of Britain's leading athletes, including Olympic silver medallist and World Champion Phillips Idowu, Goldie Sayers, Dwain Chambers, William Sharman and Chicago Marathon winner Paul Evans.

Team honours

Track and field

Men 
European Champion Clubs Relays: 4x100m, 4x200m, 4x400m and 4x800m 1999
British Athletics League Division One (Premier Division): 1992, 1995, 1997, 1998, 1999, 2000, 2001, 2002, 2003, 2004, 2006
British Athletics League Gold Cup: 1991, 1992, 1996, 1997, 1998, 1999
British Athletics League Golden Jubilee Cup: 2002, 2003

Women 
British Athletics League Golden Jubilee Cup: 2002, 2003

Cross Country

Men 
National Cross Country Championship: 1935, 1939, 1946, 1948, 2004.
National Cross Country Relay Championship: 2003, 2007

Road racing

Men 
AAA National 6-Stage Road Relay: 2001, 2002, 2003, 2004, 2005, 2007, 2008
AAA National 12-Stage Road Relay (London to Brighton 1924-1965): 1934, 1935, 1936, 1947, 1948, 1949, 1951, 2002, 2003, 2005, 2009
AAA 5 km: 2006
AAA 10 km: 2003
AAA Half-Marathon: 2002, 2004, 2007
AAA Marathon: 1996

Women 
AAA 10 km: 2006
AAA Marathon: 2004

Racewalking

Men 
RWA 20 miles: 1924, 1925, 1928, 1929, 1938, 1939, 1952, 1954, 1955, 1957, 1960, 1970
RWA 50 km: 1934, 1935, 1936, 1938, 1951, 1954, 1956, 1957, 1958, 1960, 1961, 1964, 1966, 1967, 1968, 1969, 1970
RWA 20 km: 1968, 1969, 1973, 1979
RWA 10 miles: 1947, 1948, 1957, 1958, 1959, 1960, 1963, 1970, 1971, 1972, 1974, 1982, 1984

Notable athletes

Olympians

External links 
Official site

References

Athletics clubs in London
Athletics clubs in England
Sport in the London Borough of Merton
1887 establishments in England